Jeanette Threlfall (pen name, J. T.; 24 March 1821 – 30 November 1880) was a 19th-century English hymnwriter and author of other sacred poems. She published Woodsorrel, 1856; The Babe and the Princess, 1864; Sunshine and Shadow, 1873; and two little prose works. Threlfall was brought up by an uncle and other relatives as her parents died when she was young. Suffering from poor health during the greater part of her life served to deepen her spiritual faith, and gave her time to write hymns. Her literary and religious accomplishment were lauded after her death in 1880, by such authorities as Dean Arthur Penrhyn Stanley, Dean Frederic Farrar, and Bishop Christopher Wordsworth. "We praise Thee in the morning" may be taken as a specimen of her style, while her Palm Sunday hymn, "Hosanna! loud hosanna", was very popular with children. She died in 1880.

Early life and education
Jeanette Threlfall was born in Blackburn, Lancashire, on 24 March 1821. She was the daughter of Henry Threlfall, wine merchant, and Catherine Eccles, the latter a somewhat noticeable local family, who disapproved of the marriage.

Orphaned early in life, she became the "beloved inmate" (as a memorial-card bears) of the households successively of her uncle and aunt Bannister and Mary Jane Eccles, at Park Place, Blackburn, and Golden Hill, Leyland, Lancashire; and later of their daughter, Sarah Alice Aston, and her husband, of Dean's Yard, Westminster.

From about twelve years of age, her education was left to itself, but her great love of reading, combined with delicate health, prevented this from being a great disadvantage.

Career

Threlfall worked as a Sunday school teacher. Throughout her life, she was a great reader, and made time to write sacred poems and hymns. These were sent anonymously to various periodicals. They were first collected and issued in a small volume, entitled Woodsorrel; or, Leaves from a Retired Home, by J. T., (London: J. Nisbet, 1856). The thirty-five poems in the volume did not appear to gain any notice except among friends. In 1873, she selected fifteen pieces from Woodsorrel and added 55 others, and published them as Sunshine and Shadow. Poems by Jeannette Threlfall. With Introduction by the Lord Bishop of Lincoln (Wordsworth) (London: Hunt). A third edition (1880) was entitled New Edition. With In Memoriam from the Sermons of the Dean of Westminster and Canon Farrar. The two memorial tributes were characterized as very tender and sweet.

Of Threlfall's hymns, those in collection include:— 1. Hosanna! loud hosanna, The little children sang. (Palm Sunday) 2. I think of Thee, O Saviour. (Good Friday). 3. Lo, to us a child is born. (Christmas). 4. Thou bidd'st us seek Thee early. (Early Piety.) 5. We praise Thee in the morning. (Morning.) 6. When from Egypt's house of bondage. (Children as Pilgrims.) These hymns are all taken from Threlfall's Sunshine and Shadow, 1873. I think of Thee, O Saviourwas written during an illness, at her dictation, by a friend. Hosanna! loud hosanna, The little children sang was the most widely used of her compositions.

Personal life
In 1877, Threlfall slipped during a carriage accident. The injuries led to a leg amputation. A second accident rendered her a helpless invalid. She bore her sufferings well, retaining a positive attitude till her death, 30 November 1880.

Threlfall was interred in the Aston family vault on the western side of Highgate Cemetery, (plot no.9123), on the 4th December 1880. The vault is on a corner plot, almost opposite the tomb of George Wombwell.

Themes and reception
In Julian (1892), it is remarked that "[her] sacred poems are not very well wrought, nor at all noticeable in thought or sentiment. But all through one feels that a sweet spirit utters itself."

Remarks by Stanley included:—

Remarks by Farrar included:—

Bishop Wordsworth praised her poems, and observed:—

Of Threlfall's "Hosanna! loud hosanna" (Matth. xxi. 15.), listed as a Whitsuntide hymn in Home Words (1868), Frances Ridley Havergal commented in 1881, that it "has become in the fullest sense a standard hymn. It is one of the brightest and most graceful hymns for the little ones that can adorn any collection".

Selected works
 Woodsorrel, 1856
 The Babe and the Princess, 1864
 Sunshine and Shadow, 1873

Notes

References

Attribution

Bibliography

External links
 

1821 births
1880 deaths
19th-century English non-fiction writers
19th-century English women writers
19th-century English poets
19th-century British women musicians
19th-century pseudonymous writers
Burials at Highgate Cemetery
Protestant hymnwriters
British women hymnwriters
English women poets
English religious writers
Pseudonymous women writers
English women non-fiction writers